Necrolytic acral erythema is a cutaneous condition that is a manifestation of hepatitis C viral infection or zinc deficiency.

It is a papulosquamous and sometimes vesiculobullous eruption bearing clinical and histologic similarity to other necrolytic erythemas such as necrolytic migratory erythema, pseudoglucagonoma and nutritional deficiency syndromes.

See also 
 List of cutaneous conditions

References

External links 

Erythemas
Hepatitis C virus-associated diseases